Anil Sharma may refer to:

 Anil Sharma (director) (born 1960), Indian film director and producer
 Anil Sharma (Himachal Pradesh politician) (born 1956), Indian politician, member of the Himachal Pradesh Legislative Assembly
 Anil Sharma (Uttar Pradesh politician) (born 1963), Indian politician, member of the Uttar Pradesh Legislative Assembly
 Anil Kumar Sharma (born 1971), Indian politician, member of the Delhi Legislative Assembly
 Anil Kumar Sharma (Rajasthan politician), Indian politician, member of the Rajasthan Legislative Assembly from the Sardarshahar constituency
Anil Sharma (Indian Airlines Flight 814), steward and survivor of the Indian Airlines flight 814 hijacking